Lundra is one of the 90 Legislative Assembly constituencies of Chhattisgarh state in India. It is in Surguja district and is reserved for candidates belonging to the Scheduled Tribes.

Members of Legislative Assembly

Election results

2018

References

Surguja district
Assembly constituencies of Chhattisgarh